Denis Igorevich Dorozhkin (born 8 June 1987) is a Russian former professional football player.

Career

Club
He made his Russian Premier League debut for FC Ural Yekaterinburg on 8 March 2014 in a game against FC Krasnodar.

On 1 June 2019, Dorozhkin was released by FC Pyunik.

References

External links
 

1987 births
Sportspeople from Volgograd
Living people
Russian footballers
Association football forwards
FC Rotor Volgograd players
FC Krasnodar players
FC Chernomorets Novorossiysk players
FC Torpedo Moscow players
PFC Spartak Nalchik players
FC Luch Vladivostok players
FC Ural Yekaterinburg players
FC Fakel Voronezh players
FC Pyunik players
Russian Premier League players
Armenian Premier League players
Russian expatriate footballers
Expatriate footballers in Armenia
FC Tambov players